Balanites roxburghii is a spiny, evergreen tree. It is common in open sandy plains of the Indian peninsula, western Rajasthan, west Bengal, Maharashtra , Gujarat and drier parts of India. The specific epithet roxburghii refers to the Scottish botanist William Roxburgh.

References

Sands, Martin J. S. 2001. The Desert Date and Its Relatives: A Revision of the Genus Balanites. Kew Bulletin, 56: 1–128.

roxburghii
Flora of India (region)
Flora of Rajasthan
Flora of Pakistan
Medicinal plants of Asia
Drought-tolerant trees

.